The Fate of a Flirt is a 1925 silent romantic comedy film directed by Frank R. Strayer, which stars Dorothy Revier, Forrest Stanley, and Thomas Ricketts. It was released by Columbia Pictures on November 15, 1925.

Plot
As described in a film magazine review, Sir James Gilbert, a British peer, wagers that he can win the love of a particular young American woman for whom he has his heart set. Disguised as a chauffeur, James shows his love to Mary Burgess, niece of his wealthy employer, John Burgess. To obtain the consent of Mary's aunt, the couple involves her in a harmless trick. A villain threatens blackmail and attempts to pass himself off as the Sir James Gilbert. After a variety of adventures, the blackmailer's schemes are defeated. The young woman's hitherto hostile relatives are surprised and pleased when, instead of a chauffeur, Mary becomes the bride of Sir Gilbert.

Cast list
 Dorothy Revier as Mary Burgess
 Forrest Stanley as Sir James Gilbert
 Thomas Ricketts as Uncle John Burgess
 Phillips Smalley as Sir Horace Worcester
 William Austin as Riggs
 Clarissa Selwynne as Aunt Louise Burgess
 Charles West as Eddie Graham
 Louis Payne as Simpson

References

External links

Columbia Pictures films
Films directed by Frank R. Strayer
1925 romantic comedy films
American silent feature films
American romantic comedy films
American black-and-white films
1925 films
1920s American films
Silent romantic comedy films
Silent American comedy films